Hernán Martín Pérez Redrado (born September 10, 1961) is an Argentine economist. He served as President of the Central Bank between 2004 and 2010.

Early life and career
Born Hernán Martín Pérez Redrado in Buenos Aires in 1961, he enrolled at the University of Buenos Aires and received a degree in economics. He joined U.S. economist Jeffrey Sachs as part of his advisory board, which had been invited by Bolivian president Víctor Paz Estenssoro in 1985 to implement a restructuring of the Bolivian economy, then in crisis.

He earned a master's degree in public administration from Harvard University, and was brought on by the Wall Street investment firm Salomon Brothers, where he served as adviser on their handling of the privatizations of British Airways, British Gas plc and the French Compagnie Financière de Suez, during the late 1980s. He worked for Los Angeles-based Security Pacific Bank until 1991, in which capacity he oversaw the profit sharing plan for Enersis employees, and advised on the privatization of Telmex.

Returning to Argentina in 1991, Redrado was appointed President of the National Securities Commission (CNV) by Economy Minister Domingo Cavallo, who had just implemented his Convertibility Plan and a far-reaching deregulation program. Coupled with the 1990 launch of an ambitious privatization policy by President Carlos Menem, these measures found Redrado overseeing a Buenos Aires Stock Exchange whose daily trading volume had risen around 20-fold within months. His tenure earned him the designation as Emerging Markets Committee President of the International Organization of Securities Commissions, in 1992. Differences with Cavallo over the 1993 privatization of the state oil concern, YPF, whose handling by Merrill Lynch and First Boston Redrado termed a "rip-off," led to his removal from the CNV in March 1994, however, and he established Fundación Capital, a think tank.

Redrado was selected as one of the "100 Leaders for the Next Millennium" by Time Magazine's International Edition in 1995, and he returned to public service as Secretary of Technological Education (a sub-cabinet-level post), in 1996. He was asked to run for a seat in the newly created Buenos Aires City Legislature in 1997, but was unsuccessful, and he left the secretariat in 1998 to lead Trident Investment Group, a local venture capital firm specializing in health care.

The advent of the dot-com boom led Redrado to launch of InvertirOnline.com (only the third electronic trading platform in Argentina) in June 2000; the fledgling firm prospered despite the ensuing local financial crisis, and handled over 20,000 accounts by 2003. Redrado was named Secretary of Commerce (sub-cabinet) by President Eduardo Duhalde in 2002, and he was retained in the post by Duhalde's successor, President Néstor Kirchner.

Redrado has also had three books published on the subject of contemporary economics: Tiempos de desafíos (Challenging Times, 1995),Cómo sobrevivir a la globalización (How to Survive Globalization, 1999), and Exportar para crecer (Exporting for Growth, 2003).

Central Bank presidency
Kirchner appointed Redrado President of the Central Bank of Argentina on September 24, 2004. The new central banker implemented the administration's policy of keeping a relatively undervalued Argentine peso to help bolster export competitiveness, while foreign exchange reserves soared to nearly US$50 billion. Confirmed by President Cristina Fernández de Kirchner upon her December 10, 2007, inaugural, Redrado, by 2009, had become the third-longest serving Argentine Central Bank President since the institution's formal establishment in 1935.

Fallout from the international, 2008 financial crisis later forced the Argentine government to seek domestic financing for growing public spending, as well as for foreign debt service obligations. The president ordered a US$6.7 billion account opened at the Central Bank for the latter purpose in December 2009, implying the use of foreign exchange reserves, and drawing direct opposition from Redrado. Following an impasse, he was dismissed by presidential decree on January 7, 2010, prior to which Economy Minister Amado Boudou had announced that Mario Blejer (who had expressed support for the measure) would be appointed in his stead.

Removal and controversy
Central Bank Vice President Miguel Ángel Pesce became the institution's interim head. Redrado's removal, however, triggered a vocal rebuke from opposition figures in Congress, who, citing the need to preserve the Central Bank's nominal independence, expressed doubts as to the decree's legality.
 
Redrado refused to abide by the initial decree removing him from the presidency of the Central Bank, and petitioned for a judicial power to keep him in office, at least until the Congress decides on the issue. Accordingly, the president enacted another decree for his dismissal. The legitimacy of this new decree was questioned as well, however, on the grounds of the aforementioned independence of the Central Bank, and for the lack of a prerequisite impeachment trial. Congress was at a recess period at the time, but most of its members considered returning to override the decrees through an extraordinary session.

The legitimacy of President Cristina Kirchner's policy decision to set aside a portion of the Central Bank's reserves through a Necessity and Urgency Decree was itself questioned by several opposition figures, who argued that the reserves can be only used to keep the value of currency and not for commercial purposes, that the Central Bank is independent, and that only Congress can bypass it through a law. The decree, moreover, may not meet a threshold of "necessity" and "urgency" required by the Constitution of Argentina for its enactment.

Judge María José Sarmiento handed down a ruling preventing said use of reserves. The ruling did not decide on the constitutional legitimacy of the decree itself, but instead placed the measure on hold until Congress can legislate on the issue; the Government reacted by appealing the ruling. Judge Sarmiento then annulled the decree that removed Redrado and reinstated him as President of the Central Bank the following day, due to the lack of a Congressional bill mandating his removal (which is a step required by the laws that govern the Central Bank). The ruling also refuted claims of mis-conduct cited by President Cristina Kirchner to justify his removal.

Following an appeals court ruling on January 22, however, Redrado was suspended, and Central Bank Vice President Miguel Ángel Pesce named in his stead on a provisional basis; though the injunction against the proposed use of reserves was upheld, Redrado's suspension stood pending a resolution on the matter from a committee in Congress. The impasse prompted Redrado to resign on January 30, and he was ultimately replaced by Mercedes Marcó del Pont, President of the National Bank, on February 3.

References

1961 births
Living people
Argentine people of Spanish descent
People from Buenos Aires
Argentine economists
Argentine bankers
University of Buenos Aires alumni
Harvard Kennedy School alumni
Presidents of the Central Bank of Argentina